Off the Main Sequence: The Other Science Fiction Stories of Robert A. Heinlein is a collection of 27 short stories by American writer Robert A. Heinlein, including three that were  never previously collected in book form.

The title is a play on the astronomy concept off the main sequence, and refers to these stories not being part of Heinlein's Future History.

Table of contents 

 "Introduction" by Greg Bear
 "Foreword" by Michael Cassutt
 "Editor's Note" by Andrew Wheeler
 "Successful Operation" (as "Heil") by Lyle Monroe, Futuria Fantasia, April 1940
 "Let There Be Light" by Lyle Monroe, Super Science Stories, May 1940
 ""—And He Built a Crooked House—"", Astounding Stories, February 1941
 "Beyond Doubt" by Lyle Monroe & Elma Wentz, Astonishing Stories, April 1941 (*)
 "They", Unknown, April 1941
 "Solution Unsatisfactory" by Anson MacDonald, Astounding, May 1941
 "Universe", Astounding, May 1941
 "Elsewhen" (as "Elsewhere") by Caleb Saunders, Astounding, September 1941
 "Common Sense", Astounding, October 1941
 "By His Bootstraps" by Anson MacDonald, Astounding, October 1941
 "Lost Legacy" (as "Lost Legion") by Lyle Monroe, Super Science Stories, November 1941
 "My Object All Sublime" by Lyle Monroe, Future Fiction, February 1942 (*)
 "Goldfish Bowl" by Anson MacDonald, Astounding, March 1942
 "Pied Piper" by Lyle Monroe, Astonishing Stories, March 1942 (*)
 "Free Men", The Worlds of Robert A. Heinlein, 1966
 "On the Slopes of Vesuvius", Expanded Universe, 1980
 "Columbus Was a Dope", Startling Stories, May 1947
 "Jerry Was a Man" (as "Jerry Is a Man"), Thrilling Wonder Stories, October 1947
 "Water Is for Washing", Argosy, November 1947
 "Nothing Ever Happens on the Moon", Boys' Life, April 1949
 "Gulf", Astounding, November 1949
 "Destination Moon", Short Stories, September 1950
 "The Year of the Jackpot", Galaxy Science Fiction, March 1952
 "Project Nightmare", Amazing Stories, April/May 1953
 "Sky Lift", Imagination, November 1953
 "Tenderfoot in Space", Boys' Life, May 1958
 "All You Zombies—", Fantasy & Science Fiction, March 1959

(*) Previously uncollected in a Heinlein collection

2005 short story collections
Short story collections by Robert A. Heinlein